Melaleuca similis is a plant in the myrtle family, Myrtaceae and is endemic to the south west of Western Australia. It is a small shrub, similar to Melaleuca stramentosa with its narrow, almost cylindrical leaves and heads of pink to purple flowers but lacks the matted, silky hairs on the young leaves and outer edge of the flower cup.

Description

The flowers are a shade of pink to purple and arranged in heads on the ends of branches which continue to grow after flowering and sometimes also in the upper leaf axils. The outer surface of the flower cup (the hypanthium) is hairy although it lacks the woolly, matted hairs of M. stramentosa. There are five bundles of stamens around the flower, each with 4 or 5 stamens.

Taxonomy and naming
The specific epithet (similis) is a Latin word meaning "like" or "resembling" referring to the similarity of this species to others growing in nearby areas, especially Melaleuca plumea and Melaleuca stramentosa.

Distribution and habitat
Melaleuca similis occurs in the Ravensthorpe district in the Esperance Plains and Mallee biogeographic regions. It grows in sand along drainage lines.

Conservation
Melaleuca similis is listed as "Priority One" by the Government of Western Australia Department of Parks and Wildlife, meaning that it is poorly known occurring in only a few locations and is potentially at risk.

References

similis
Myrtales of Australia
Plants described in 1999
Rosids of Western Australia
Endemic flora of Western Australia
Taxa named by Lyndley Craven